is a Japanese manga artist best known for her manga series Flunk Punk Rumble, Yamada-kun and the Seven Witches and A Couple of Cuckoos and their accompanying anime series. Her debut work was a one-shot called Glory Days in Kodansha's Magazine Special. She assisted Hiro Mashima on Rave Master and Fairy Tail. In 2005, she released the comedy one-shot Flunk Punk Rumble in Shonen Magazine Wonder, which was later made into a short series and eventually publicized in Kodansha's Weekly Shōnen Magazine from 2006 to 2011, with a total of 211 chapters. In 2012, she released Yamada-kun and the Seven Witches, which has to date sold over 3 million copies, and was adapted into a live-action drama series and a TV anime series. In 2015, Yoshikawa attended Anime Expo as a guest.

Style and influence

At Anime Expo 2015, Yoshikawa said that she was inspired by Dragon Ball, and would try to copy some of Akira Toriyama's panels and manuscripts. She credits Hiro Mashima for "teaching her everything I know" while she was assisting him on Fairy Tail. Yoshikawa worked as a manga assistant under Mashima for about four years.

In the Natalie interview, Yoshikawa said that she had thought of the body swapping idea in the Yankee-kun days, and had researched some medical books on the differences between men and women, both physically and emotionally, but generally went with it because she liked the idea. "It just kind of came to me, but I was wondering how a guy finding himself in a girl's body would react, and the reverse". She treats a body-swapped character as an entirely different character. When it was noted that the main characters for both of her works were delinquents, Yoshikawa replied that those types of characters came easily for her, as she grew up in the lower end of Tokyo. The characters and their names are not based on her friends so that they can act crazy. At Anime Expo 2015, she said that the characters reflect different aspects of herself.

With regards to drawing in Yamada-kun, she tries to vary each kiss, but mostly uses the side angle to make sure it comes through. With regards to kisses between members of the same gender, she replied that wasn't intended to target any specific demographic but just "an inevitable outcome." At the time of Anime Expo, she said she had five assistants. She does her drawing by hand in black-and-white, and uses the computer for the filling in colors. She spends about half of her time on story, and the other half on actual drawing.

Works
  (2006-2011)
  (2012–2017)
  (2020–present)
 Hiiragi-san no Kyūketsu Jijō (2021–present)

References

External links
 
 Miki Yoshikawa's interview at Anime Expo at Kodansha Comics

Living people
Women manga artists
1982 births
Japanese female comics artists
Female comics writers